Michael Skjelderup (22 October 1769 – 16 April 1852) was a Norwegian physician and educator.

Skjelderup was born in the parish of Hof in Vestfold, Norway. He graduated from the Royal Danish Academy of Surgery  (1794) and first held a position as a professor at the University of Copenhagen (1805–14).  He subsequently became a professor at the University of Oslo (1815 - 1849). He was the father of Norwegian Government minister Jacob Worm Skjelderup.

References

External links
Michael Quarterly – The Norwegian Medical Society 
Michael Skjelderup Gold Metal- University of Oslo

1769 births
1852 deaths
People from Vestfold
19th-century Norwegian physicians
Norwegian educators
University of Copenhagen alumni
Academic staff of the University of Copenhagen
Academic staff of the University of Oslo
Recipients of the St. Olav's Medal
Knights of the Order of the Polar Star
Burials at the Cemetery of Our Saviour
Royal Norwegian Society of Sciences and Letters